Heinz Kokott (14 November 1900 – 29 May 1976) was a German general in the Wehrmacht during World War II.  He was a recipient of the Knight's Cross of the Iron Cross of Nazi Germany.

Kokott took part in the siege of Bastogne in December 1944.

Awards and decorations

 Knight's Cross of the Iron Cross on 17 March 1943 as Oberst and commander of Grenadier-Regiment 337

Other 
After his capture, there were some interrogations.

S.L.A. Marshall published a book in 1946 (title: BASTOGNE - The First Eight Days). It can be read as Public Domain.  
The book has an appendix; here is a quote from it:

References

Citations

Bibliography

 

1900 births
1976 deaths
People from Strzelce Opolskie
People from the Province of Silesia
Major generals of the German Army (Wehrmacht)
Recipients of the Knight's Cross of the Iron Cross
German prisoners of war in World War II held by the United States